William Allan Shackleton (9 March 1908 – 16 November 1971) was an English first-class cricketer, who played five  matches for Yorkshire County Cricket Club between 1928 and 1934.

Born in Keighley, Yorkshire, Shackleton was a right arm medium pacer and leg break bowler, who took six wickets at 21.66, with a best of 4 for 18 against Middlesex.  He scored 49 runs as a right-handed batsman, his highest score of 25 coming against Kent, at an overall average of 8.16. Shackleton also took three catches.

Shackleton died in November 1971 in Bridlington, Yorkshire.

References

External links
Cricinfo Profile

1908 births
1971 deaths
Yorkshire cricketers
Cricketers from Keighley
English cricketers of 1919 to 1945
English cricketers